Mount Fletcher, officially Tlokoeng, is a town in Joe Gqabi District Municipality in the Eastern Cape province of South Africa, 69 km north-north-east of Maclear.

Founded in 1882, Mount Fletcher takes its name from the mountain nearby. This was probably named after the Reverend John Fletcher of Madeley in England, a friend of John Wesley, although it is stated to have been named after a Captain Fletcher who was stationed there.

In 2022, the town was officially renamed Tlokoeng which "means place of the Tlokoa clan" in Sesotho.  The provincial hospital in Tlokoeng is named Tayler Bequest.

References

Populated places in the Elundini Local Municipality
Populated places established in 1882